Noor Ahmad Lakanwal (born 3 January 2005) is an Afghan cricketer. He made his international debut for the Afghanistan cricket team in June 2022.

Career
He made his first-class debut on 29 April 2019, for Kabul Region in the 2019 Ahmad Shah Abdali 4-day Tournament. He made his Twenty20 debut on 8 October 2019, for Mis Ainak Knights in the 2019 Shpageeza Cricket League.

In December 2019, he was named in Afghanistan's squad for the 2020 Under-19 Cricket World Cup. In July 2020, he was named in the St Lucia Zouks squad for the 2020 Caribbean Premier League. He made his List A debut on 14 October 2020, for Mis Ainak Region in the 2020 Ghazi Amanullah Khan Regional One Day Tournament.

In December 2020, at the age of 15, he was signed by the Melbourne Renegades to play in the 2020–21 Big Bash League season in Australia. In March 2021, Chennai Super Kings included Noor as a net bowler in their squad for 2021 Indian Premier League. In June 2021, Noor also played for the Karachi Kings in the 2021 Pakistan Super League.

In July 2021, Noor was named in Afghanistan's One Day International (ODI) squad for their series against Pakistan. In December 2021, he was named in Afghanistan's team for the 2022 ICC Under-19 Cricket World Cup in the West Indies. Later in the same month, he was signed by the Quetta Gladiators following the players' draft in the Supplementary category for the 2022 Pakistan Super League. On 12 February 2022, he made his debut for the team, against Islamabad United at the Gaddafi Stadium in Lahore.

In February 2022, he was bought by the Gujarat Titans in the auction for the 2022 Indian Premier League tournament.

International career

In May 2022, Ahmad was named in Afghanistan's Twenty20 International (T20I) squad for their series against Zimbabwe, and as a reserve in Afghanistan's One Day International (ODI) squad for the same tour. He made his T20I debut on 14 June 2022, for Afghanistan against Zimbabwe.

Ahmad made his ODI debut on 30 November 2022, against Sri Lanka.

Notes

References

External links
 

2005 births
Living people
Afghan cricketers
Afghanistan Twenty20 International cricketers
Kabul Eagles cricketers
Karachi Kings cricketers
Melbourne Renegades cricketers
Mis Ainak Knights cricketers
Quetta Gladiators cricketers
Galle Gladiators cricketers
Welsh Fire cricketers